Tatiana "Tati" Garmendia López (born 16 February 1974) is a former Spanish handball player. She played for the club Akaba Bera Bera, and on the Spanish national team.

She played on the Spanish team at the 2008 European Women's Handball Championship, where Spain reached the final, after defeating Germany in the semifinal.

Following her retirement, she became a coach at Bera Bera.

References

External links

1974 births
Living people
Sportspeople from San Sebastián
Spanish female handball players
Competitors at the 2001 Mediterranean Games
Mediterranean Games silver medalists for Spain
Mediterranean Games medalists in handball
Handball players from the Basque Country (autonomous community)